Österreich 1 (Ö1) is an Austrian radio station: one of the four national channels operated by Austria's public broadcaster ORF. It focuses on classical music and opera, jazz, documentaries and features, news, radio plays and dramas, Kabarett, quiz shows, and discussions.

History

The channel was launched on 1 October 1967 as part of an exercise which saw the ORF's radio output reorganized into three numbered services, the other two being the regional stations grouped as Ö2 and the pop music channel Ö3.

Earlier, in 1964, there had been a petition for a national referendum, whereby more than 800,000 citizens declared themselves against ideological appointments of key positions within the public broadcasting service by the Austrian grand coalition government of Chancellor Alfons Gorbach (ÖVP) and Vice-Chancellor Bruno Pittermann (SPÖ) according to the Austrian Proporz system. Two years later, a legal regulation of a nonpartisan broadcasting was passed by the National Council parliament, entailing a relaunch of the ORF radio stations.

Ö1 was designated to comply with the public educational mandate (Bildungsauftrag) and to offer a broadly cultural program for an artistically inclined audience. One focus is on news broadcasts like the one-hour Mittagsjournal ("Noon Journal") and Morgenjournal ("Morning Journal"), launched in the course of the coverage of the 1968 Prague Spring. Beside established programmes such as Du holde Kunst, first aired in 1945, Ö1 since the 1970s has also broadcast radio documentaries (Hörbilder), music programmes beyond the strictly classical canon (Pasticcio, Spielräume), and several recurring reports on everyday life in a feuilleton style like Der Schalldämpfer by Axel Corti (discontinued upon his death in 1993). Similar to other classical music radio stations, Ö1 has to bear with the tension between an elitist "Hofrat widow broadcaster" and a "Classic FM" popularisation, with the station's style and scheduling a matter of ongoing debates.

Operation

After having broadcast from Funkhaus Wien on Argentinierstrasse in the Wieden district of Vienna for decades, the station moved to the ORF-Zentrum at Küniglberg in the Hietzing district in late 2022. The current station identification was composed by the jazz musician Werner Pirchner in 1994, the slogan Ö1 gehört gehört—a pun on "to be heard" in German conforming with "ought to"—was created by the author Wolf Haas. The interval signal of Ö1 is a three-note chord, played on a viola. There were two earlier versions of the signal: first one was played by harpsichord and the second one by a synth.

Since 2010 a 75-minute altered block of programming is broadcast every morning on the shortwave frequencies of former Radio Österreich International as Ö1 International. Ö1 internet radio can also be listened to live on the ORF website through streaming audio, the programmes can also be heard for a week after broadcast at no charge. Several are available as downloads and podcasts.

Ö1 runs the RadioKulturhaus venue in Funkhaus Wien including the KulturCafé coffee house. It also participates in the annual Donauinselfest music festival.

Programs

See also
 List of radio stations in Austria and Liechtenstein

External links
 Ö1 Website
 Ö1 Programme

Radio stations in Austria
Radio stations established in 1967
1967 establishments in Austria
ORF (broadcaster)